Martin Metcalfe is a singer and artist from Bathgate, Scotland. He previously played in Goodbye Mr Mackenzie, and Angelfish. He is currently in bands called The Fornicators and the Filthy Tongues, and also paints.

Metcalfe contributed song-writing to four tracks on the 2018 Skids album, Burning Cities, which charted at 28 on the Billboard Top 100.

References

External links

Living people
21st-century Scottish male singers
Year of birth missing (living people)